Dysgonomonas termitidis is a Gram-negative, anaerobic and non-motile bacterium from the genus of Dysgonomonas which has been isolated from the gut of the termite Reticulitermes speratus.

References

External links
Type strain of Dysgonomonas termitidis at BacDive -  the Bacterial Diversity Metadatabase

Bacteroidia
Bacteria described in 2015